The church of San Pietro d'Alcantara is found on via Padre Onorio in Parma. The church is dedicated to the canonized Franciscan friar, Peter of Alcantara. Construction at this site began in 1706, next to a reformed Franciscan monastery. In 1810, Napoleon closed the monastery. The church was not reconsecrated till 1927. It contains an Glory of St. Peter of Alcantara, painted in 1736 by Clemente Ruta.

References

Alessandro
Pietro Alcantara
Baroque architecture in Parma